Electric Five is an album by Italian jazz trumpeter and composer Enrico Rava recorded in 1994 and released on the Soul Note label.

Reception

As it was written in JazzTimes 5/96 review: "ELECTRIC FIVE is an aural approximation of a Fellini film: surrealistic, indulgent in its broad humor, and ultimately big-hearted...".

Track listing
All compositions by Enrico Rava except as indicated
 ″Da Silva″ - 5:31
 "Fragile" - 3:41
 "The Fearless Five" - 4:26
 "Lavori Casalinghi" - 5:19
 "Milestones" (Miles Davis)- 5:05
 "Overboard" - 6:55
 "La Strada" (Nino Rota) - 1:52
 "Fefè" - 4:48
 "Satie" - 4:39
 "Lady Orlando" - 2:28
 "Boplicity" (Cleo Henry) - 3:16
Recorded at MU REC Studio, Milano, Italy, 1994-09-29 and 1994-09-30

Personnel
Enrico Rava - trumpet, flugelhorn
Domenico Caliri - electric guitar, classical guitar (10)
Roberto Cecchetto - electric guitar
Giovanni Maier - bass
U.T. Gandhi - drums 
Special Guest
Gianluigi Trovesi - alto saxophone, bass clarinet

References

Black Saint/Soul Note albums
Enrico Rava albums
1995 albums
Albums produced by Giovanni Bonandrini